Paul Sanford (born September 13, 1967) is an American politician. A Republican, he was a member of the Alabama State Senate from the 7th District, winning a special election in June 2009.

References

External links
 Biography at Alabama Legislature

21st-century American politicians
Republican Party Alabama state senators
Candidates in the 2022 United States House of Representatives elections
Living people
1967 births